Mohmoud Elatar is a paralympic athlete from Egypt competing mainly in category F58 javelin and discus events.

Mahmoud competed in both the F58 discus and javelin events at both the 2000 and 2004 Summer Paralympics winning gold in both events at the 2000 games and silver in both at the 2004 games.

References

External links
 

Paralympic athletes of Egypt
Athletes (track and field) at the 2000 Summer Paralympics
Athletes (track and field) at the 2004 Summer Paralympics
Paralympic silver medalists for Egypt
Paralympic bronze medalists for Egypt
Living people
Medalists at the 2000 Summer Paralympics
Medalists at the 2004 Summer Paralympics
Year of birth missing (living people)
Paralympic medalists in athletics (track and field)
Egyptian male discus throwers
Egyptian male javelin throwers
Wheelchair discus throwers
Wheelchair javelin throwers
Paralympic discus throwers
Paralympic javelin throwers